Kevin Mabbutt (born 5 December 1958) is an English retired footballer who played for Bristol City and Crystal Palace in the Football League.

He played over 100 league games for Bristol City, before joining Crystal Palace in October 1981 in exchange for Terry Boyle. He was their top scorer that season, with eight goals, and helped them avoid a second successive relegation.

He came to national attention on 21 October 1978 when he scored 3 goals for Bristol City in a 3–1 win over Manchester United at Old Trafford. He remains one of only a handful of opposing players to have scored a hat-trick at the home of Manchester United.

His father is Ray Mabbutt and his brother is Gary Mabbutt.

As of 2005 he owns a restaurant in Los Angeles.

References

1958 births
Living people
English Football League players
Bristol City F.C. players
Crystal Palace F.C. players
Footballers from Bristol
English footballers
Association football forwards